Stadio Mario Rigamonti is a soccer stadium located in Brescia, Italy. It is currently the home of Brescia Calcio.

It is dedicated to Mario Rigamonti, a defender of the Grande Torino, born in Brescia, who died in the Superga air disaster in May 1949.

Gallery

References

Mario Rigamonti
Mario
Buildings and structures in Brescia
Sports venues in Lombardy
Brescia Calcio